When Devils Strike is the ninth solo studio album by American hip hop recording artist SPM. It was released on October 3, 2006 via Dope House Records.

Background
The CD sold approximately 50,000 copies the first week and landed as #46 on the US Billboard 200 chart. The CD consists of 15 tracks. The album also comes with a free "Screwed & Chopped" version of the album by Michael "5000" Watts. At the time of the album's release, SPM was incarcerated.

Track listing

Chart history

References

External links

2006 albums
South Park Mexican albums
Albums produced by Happy Perez